Silverstein Peak is a prominent,  peak on the west edge of the ice-covered Vinson Plateau in the Sentinel Range of Ellsworth Mountains, Antarctica. It surmounts Roché Glacier to the north and Zapol Glacier to the southwest.

The peak was named by US-ACAN in 2006 after Dr. Samuel C. Silverstein, member of the 1966-67 American Antarctic Mountaineering Expedition that made the first ascent of Vinson Massif and other high mountains in the Sentinel Range.

Location

USGS mapping in 1961, updated in 1988.

Maps
 Vinson Massif.  Scale 1:250 000 topographic map.  Reston, Virginia: US Geological Survey, 1988.
 D. Gildea and C. Rada.  Vinson Massif and the Sentinel Range.  Scale 1:50 000 topographic map.  Omega Foundation, 2007.
 Antarctic Digital Database (ADD). Scale 1:250000 topographic map of Antarctica. Scientific Committee on Antarctic Research (SCAR). Since 1993, regularly updated.

References
 SCAR Composite Gazetteer of Antarctica.

Ellsworth Mountains
Mountains of Ellsworth Land
Four-thousanders of Antarctica